The James M. Fisher House, at 598 Pioneer Rd. in Weiser, Idaho, was built in 1908.  It was listed on the National Register of Historic Places in 1986.

It is a red brick house with sandstone lintels and sills.  It was designed by architects H.W. Bond & Co.

References

National Register of Historic Places in Washington County, Idaho
Queen Anne architecture in Idaho
Colonial Revival architecture in Idaho
Houses completed in 1908